The Glass Bottle was an American pop band fronted by Gary Criss, whose song about bitterness and heartbreak, "I Ain't Got Time Anymore", was recorded in 1970 and reached #36 on the Billboard Hot 100 chart in September 1971, and #15 in Canada. The band was co-produced by Dickie Goodman. Goodman had an advertising deal with a PR firm that was trying to save the glass industry from losing soda pop clients to plastic bottles, so Goodman and partner Bill Ramal formed a group, called them "The Glass Bottle" and produced their album. The group produced two hits, "I Ain't Got Time Anymore" and "The Girl Who Loved Me When", before breaking up and drifting into obscurity.

Gary Criss had previously been signed to Diamond Records in the early to mid 1960s.  However, none of his records for the label charted.  He had a few solo disco hits in the 1970s, and is now in the antique automobile business.

The group's song "Wonderwheel" is featured in the 1970 film "The People Next Door".

The original version of "I Ain't Got Time Anymore" charted in September / October 1970 in the UK in a version sung by Cliff Richard.

American pop music groups